The Greater Manila Area is the contiguous urbanization region surrounding the Metropolitan Manila area. This built-up zone includes Metro Manila and the neighboring provinces of Bulacan to the north, Cavite and Laguna to the south, and Rizal to the east. Though sprawl continues to absorb new zones, some urban zones are independent clusters of settlements surrounded by non-urban areas.

In early 2021, during the COVID-19 pandemic, the area was also referred to as the "NCR Plus" or "NCR+" (National Capital Region Plus) by authorities, with regard to the designation of community quarantines.

Statistics

Gallery

See also 
 Mega Manila
 Metro Manila
 Urban Luzon

References